Albert Lewis Holladay (April 16, 1805 – October 18, 1856) was a Presbyterian minister, educator and was elected to the presidency of Hampden–Sydney College in 1856 but died before taking office.

Biography
Holladay was born in Spotsylvania County, Virginia in 1805. He was educated at the University of Virginia and was a teacher in both Richmond and Charlottesville, going onto become a professor of ancient languages at Hampden–Sydney College. In 1833 he retired as a professor and entered the Union Theological Seminary at Hampden–Sydney.

After graduating from the Seminary, Holladay spent eleven years as a missionary in Persia, but returned to Charlottesville after encountering unusual hardships and trials. Already ill when he was elected as President of Hampden–Sydney College in 1856, he never made it to the campus to take his position and died on October 18, 1856.

References

1805 births
1856 deaths
University of Virginia alumni
Union Presbyterian Seminary alumni
Presidents of Hampden–Sydney College
American Christian theologians
Presbyterian Church in the United States of America ministers
19th-century American clergy